Chang Hen Ge is a literary masterpiece from the Tang dynasty by the famous Chinese poet Bai Juyi (772–846).  It retells the love story between Emperor Xuanzong of Tang and his favorite concubine Yang Guifei (719–756).  This epic poem is dated from 809.

Influence
A long list of literary, political, visual, musical and film works have been based on or referenced by Chang Hen Ge.  Immediately after the poem had been written, its influence spread. Bai Juyi's friend Chen Hong (fl. 810s) created a dramatic version, Chang Hen Zhuan, which later inspired Rain on the Paulownia Tree (Wutong Yu) by Bai Pu (1226–after 1306) and The Palace of Eternal Youth (Changsheng Dian) by Hong Sheng (1645–1704).

Painter Li Yishi (1886–1942) illustrated the poem with a series of thirty paintings. In classical music the poem has been set as a cantata by Huang Zi (1933) and as an orchestral song by Mo Fan (1991). The poem is referenced in the writings of Mao Zedong.

Author Madeleine Thien quotes from the poem in the closing pages of her award-winning 2016 novel, Do Not Say We Have Nothing.

The 1995 novel The Song of Everlasting Sorrow shares the same title as the poem but tells a story about a woman's turbulent life in 20th-century Shanghai. It was adapted into the 2005 Hong Kong film Everlasting Regret.

The poem is central to the plot of Legend of the Demon Cat. In this 2017 historical fantasy film directed by Chen Kaige, the poet Bai Juyi is solving a murder case together with monk Kūkai. Throughout the film, Bai Juyi is struggling to finish his poem about the legendary beauty of Yang Guifei, without realizing that the murder case is also related to her death, a generation ago.

It had a great influence on Japanese literature during the Heian period, including Genji Monogatari.

References

External links

https://www.gushiwen.cn/GuShiWen_c79924d76e.aspx

Tang dynasty poetry
Love stories
Love poems